Parastasia is a genus of beetle belonging to the family Scarabaeidae.

List of species
 Parastasia brevipes (LeConte, 1856)
 Parastasia ephippium Snellen., 1864
 Parastasia montrouzieri Fairmaire, 1883
 Parastasia terraereginae Kuijten, 1992

References
 Biolib

Scarabaeidae